The Nova Scotia Mine is an abandoned silver mine in Cobalt, Ontario, Canada, located on the east shore of Peterson Lake.

References

External links

Nova Scotia Mine, Cobalt, Coleman Township, Timiskaming District, Ontario, Canada

Silver mines in Canada
Mines in Cobalt, Ontario